Well poisoning is the act of malicious manipulation of potable water resources in order to cause illness or death, or to deny an opponent access to fresh water resources.

Well poisoning has been historically documented as a strategy during wartime since antiquity, and was used both offensively (as a terror tactic to disrupt and depopulate a target area) and defensively (as a scorched earth tactic to deny an invading army sources of clean water). Rotting corpses (both animal and human) thrown down wells were the most common implementation; in one of the earliest examples of biological warfare, corpses known to have died from common transmissible diseases of the Pre-Modern era such as bubonic plague or tuberculosis were especially favored for well-poisoning.

Additionally, well poisoning was one of the three gravest antisemitic accusations made against Jews during the pre-modern period (the other two being host desecration and blood libel). Similar accusations were also made of Koreans living in Japan in the aftermath of the 1923 Great Kantō earthquake. In both cases the accusation was never substantiated, but did lead to wide-scale persecution and pogroms against the group so accused.

History of implementation in warfare

Instances of medieval usage
Well poisoning has been used as an important scorched earth tactic at least since medieval times. In 1462, for example, Prince Vlad III the Impaler of Wallachia utilized this method to delay his pursuing Ottoman Turk adversaries. Whilst retreating through Turkish-controlled Bulgaria, across the Danube River and back to the capital of Wallachia that same year, Vlad's army employed the poisoning of wells and other sources of water, as well as other scorched earth tactics en route to his country on both sides of the Danube, meaning that he deliberately polluted the water supplies of his fellow Romanians even at the cost of their lives if it slowed down his Muslim foes. Nearly 500 years later during the Winter War, the Finns rendered wells unusable by planting animal carcasses or feces in them in order to passively combat invading Soviet forces.

Instances of modern usage

During the 20th century, the practice of poisoning wells has lost most of its potency and practicality against an organized force as modern military logistics ensure secure and decontaminated supplies and resources. Nevertheless, German forces during First World War poisoned wells in France as part of Operation Alberich. A few religions have laws condemning such scorched earth tactics. Most notably Islam, in its scripture, dictates that water-bodies may not be poisoned even during a battle and enemies must be allowed access to water.

Military forces of the  Yishuv and subsequently of the State of Israel had recourse to a biological warfare strategy, in violation of the Geneva Protocol of 1925 prohibiting the use of chemical and biological agents in conflicts, of poisoning the wells of Palestinian villages, and those used by Arab armies during both the 1948 Palestine war and the 1948 Arab–Israeli War. When two undercover operatives engaged in poisoning wells in Gaza were caught by Egyptian forces, Egypt complained to the United Nations in May 1948. 

In the late 20th century, accusations of well-poisoning were brought up against Serbs, most notoriously in relation to the poisoning of Kosovo Albanians. There have also been accusations of well-poisoning as a part of the Srebrenica massacre.

In the 21st century, reports of well contamination by Israeli settlers in the West Bank have surfaced. Cases include a 2004 incident in which rotting chicken carcasses were found in a well at At-tuwani near Hebron, and in 2006, an incident occurred in the Palestinian village of Madama, Nablus, in which neighbouring Israeli settlers both "poisoned the village's only well and shot at aid workers who came to clean it."

History of well poisoning as libel

Medieval accusations against Jews 

Despite some vague understanding of how diseases could spread, the existence of viruses and bacteria was unknown in medieval times, and the outbreak of disease could not be scientifically explained. Any sudden deterioration of health was often blamed on poisoning. Europe was hit by several waves of Black Death (often identified as bubonic plague) throughout the late Middle Ages. Crowded cities were especially hard hit by the disease, with death tolls as high as 50% of the population. In their distress, emotionally distraught survivors searched desperately for an explanation. The city-dwelling Jews of the Middle Ages, living in walled-up, segregated ghetto districts, aroused suspicion. An outbreak of plague thus became the trigger for Black Death persecutions, with hundreds of Jews burned at the stake, or rounded up in synagogues and private houses that were then set aflame. With the decline of plague in Europe, these accusations lessened, but the term "well-poisoning" remains a loaded one that continues to crop up even today among anti-Semites around the world.

Walter Laqueur writes in his book The Changing Face of Anti-Semitism: From Ancient Times to the Present Day:
There were no mass attacks against "Jewish poisoners" after the period of the Black Death, but the accusation became part and parcel of antisemitic dogma and language. It appeared again in early 1953 in the form of the "doctors' plot" in Stalin's last days, when hundreds of Jewish physicians in the Soviet Union were arrested and some of them killed on the charge of having caused the death of prominent Communist leaders... Similar charges were made in the 1980s and 1990s in radical Arab nationalist and Muslim fundamentalist propaganda that accused the Jews of spreading AIDS and other infectious diseases.

Modern instances of antisemitic libel

Allegations of well poisoning entwined with antisemitism have also emerged in the discourse around modern epidemics and pandemics such as swine flu, Ebola, avian flu, SARS, and COVID-19.

EU address by Mahmoud Abbas

In his address to the European Parliament on 23 June 2016, in Brussels, Palestinian Authority president and PLO chairman Mahmoud Abbas made an unsubstantiated allegation, "accusing rabbis of poisoning Palestinian wells". This was based on false media reports saying Israeli rabbis were inciting the poisoning of water of Palestinians, led by a rabbi Shlomo Mlma or Mlmad from the Council of Rabbis in the West Bank settlements. A rabbi by that name could not be located, nor is such an organization listed.

Abbas said: "Only a week ago, a number of rabbis in Israel announced, and made a clear announcement, demanding that their government poison the water to kill the Palestinians ... Isn't that clear incitement to commit mass killings against the Palestinian people?"
The speech received a standing ovation. The speech was described as "echoing anti-Semitic claims". A day later, on Saturday 26 June, Abbas admitted that "his claims at the EU were baseless". Abbas' further said that he "didn't intend to do harm to Judaism or to offend Jewish people around the world." Israeli Prime Minister Benjamin Netanyahu stated in reaction, that Abbas had spread a "blood libel" in his European Parliament address.

See also 
 Environmental impact of war
 Groundwater pollution
 In My Country There Is Problem
 Nakam
 Water supply terrorism
 Jonestown

References

External links 
 Accusation of Well-Poisoning (Jewish Encyclopedia)
 The Virtual Jewish History Tour. Belgium

Christian antisemitism in the Middle Ages
Antisemitic canards
Environmental impact of war
Biological warfare
Black Death
Water wells
Terrorism tactics
Mass poisoning
Chemical warfare